Fabian Holland (born 9 October 2002) is a Dutch rugby union player, who currently plays as a lock for  in New Zealand's domestic National Provincial Championship competition and for the  in Super Rugby.

Early life
He grew up in a family where rugby was not directly central. But when he was allowed to try out some sports at a young age, he ended up at the Castricumse Rugby Club at the age of five. There he found himself becoming a different boy when he entered the rugby field. "I was more myself."

The fire in him was further fueled when the All Black Sevens team, which represents New Zealand at the major international sevens tournaments, held a training camp at the club where he played in 2014. "I thought it was so cool to see that the players as one whole worked hard to become the best in the world. I thought: wow, I want to be among that later." That is why Holland went to New Zealand in early 2019 to study and play rugby at Christchurch Boys' High School. And as it often happens: he ended up in the right place via via. Thanks to the contacts of an acquaintance from his rugby club in Castricum, who was also active in New Zealand, Holland was able to book a ticket.

Holland was sixteen when he set foot on the other side of the world for a stay of only six months. But with his 2.04 meters, 118 kilograms and talent, he caught the eye in Christchurch. He went from the second to the first XV team and his stay was extended. Holland: "You don't want to know how much research they did. They even went back to matches I played when I was under eight years old."

He initially arrived in 2019 for a six-month period at Christchurch Boys' High School, where he played for the first XV. After the six-month period, he enrolled full time at Christchurch Boys'.

Rugby career
The COVID-19 pandemic, which largely paralyzed the sports world, did not throw a spanner in the works for Holland. The virus did less well on the island group, although the rugby player had to go into lockdown for a while. He used that period to obtain his VWO diploma. Holland has now started studying sports science at the University of Otago. Moreover, on the other side of the world, he gathered around him people who are dear to him. "Quite special in such a short time," said the rugby player. He has also developed within the field. Holland played in a position in the backline in the Netherlands and ended up in a 'lock position' via the number 8 spot. In short, the lock is the engine of the scrum, with the players facing each other in a bent over position when play resumes. He does not want to fill that position in the traditional way. "In New Zealand they look at this position in a completely different way," says the relatively fast and agile rugby player.
Called during lecture

Tabai Matson also noticed this, the head coach of the New Zealand Under 20 team, who wanted to add Holland to his team. "He called while I was having a lecture, so I didn't answer. When I called back, he didn't answer," said Holland. Eventually the message got through, after which Holland contacted his parents at two o'clock in the morning Dutch time. "That was emotional, because of course we never expected this when I left here two years ago."

Through the Baby Blacks he hopes to follow in the footsteps of his great examples Samuel Whitelock and Brodie Retallick, the locks of the All Blacks and "masters of their position". However, it is not that far yet, because to be eligible for the prestigious team you have to live in New Zealand for five years from the age of eighteen. Meanwhile, the Dutch rugby team is also making progress with a talented batch. What would Holland do if national coach Zane Gardiner contacts him? "Then I would very kindly say no. I have everything here: my girlfriend, friends and study. Moreover, it becomes difficult to arrange visas." Holland says it is following the actions of Orange with great interest. "I will always proudly say that I am a Dutchman. I am happy that I grew up in the Netherlands, I would not have wanted it any other way. He made his second NPC appearance on 5 November against .

On 23 June 2022, the  announced that Holland had signed a three-year (fully professional) contract with the Dunedin-based franchise.

International rugby career
Holland has played for the New Zealand national under-20 rugby union team in 2021 and the New Zealand Barbarians under-18 team in 2020. In 2020 Holland made the New Zealand Schools team.

Reference list

External links
Itsrugby.co.uk profile

Dutch rugby union players
Living people
Rugby union locks
Otago rugby union players
People educated at Christchurch Boys' High School
2002 births
Highlanders (rugby union) players
Dutch expatriate sportspeople in New Zealand
Sportspeople from North Holland
Dutch expatriate rugby union players
Expatriate rugby union players in New Zealand